This is a list of television series that have been aired in the United Kingdom.

British programming

Universal Channel 

 House 
 Royal Pains
 Chance
 Condor
 Major Crimes 
 Law & Order: Special Victims Unit 
 Bates Motel
 Chicago Med
 Sleepy Hollow
 Mr. Robot
 The Resident
 Rookie Blue 
 Hallmark, de la Héirb Universal Channel 2010
 How to Get Away with Murder 
 The Disappearance
 Motive
 Burden of Truth
 Pure Genius
 CSI franchise
 Without a Trace
 Cold Case
 Law & Order: Criminal Intent 
 Law & Order 
 Chicago Justice
 JAG
 Psych 
 Private Eyes
 Proven Innocent
 Fairly Legal
 Gone
 Conviction
 Ransom
 White Collar
 Departure
 Coroner
 The District

Sky Witness 

9-1-1
Blindspot
Departure 
FBI
FBI: Most Wanted
FBI: International
Hannibal
CSI: Crime Scene Investigation
Bones
Bull 
The Good Doctor
The Equalizer
The Rookie
Blue Bloods 
Chicago Fire
Chicago Med 
Chicago P.D. 
Coroner 
Criminal Minds
Elementary
For Life
For the People
Grey's Anatomy 
How to Get Away with Murder 
Instinct
Law & Order
Law & Order: Organized Crime
Law & Order: Special Victims Unit
Madam Secretary
New Amsterdam
Private Eyes 
Station 19
Transplant

13th Street Universal 

 Chase
 Unsolved Mysteries
 The Mrs. Bradley Mysteries
 The Glades
 Cold Case
 Without a Trace
 Dexter
 Murdoch Mysteries
 Southland
 Burn Notice
 Leverage
 Raines
 The Closer
 Agatha Christie's Marple
 CSI
 CSI: Miami
 CSI: NY
 Body of Proof
 Flashpoint
 Doc Martin
 Women's Murder Club
 Rookie Blue
 JAG
 Law & Order
 Law & Order: Criminal Intent
 Law & Order: UK
 Monk
 Numb3rs
 NYPD Blue
 Shattered
 In Plain Sight
 Castle
 Agatha Christie's Poirot
 The Listener
 Third Watch
 V
 Criminal Minds

Specials
 Humpty Dumpty

English language

0–9

A

B

C

D

E

F

G

H

I

J

K

L

M

N

O

P

Q

QI – panel game
Quatermass – science fiction serial
Quatermass and the Pit – science fiction serial
The Quatermass Experiment – science fiction
Quatermass II – science fiction serial
Quayside – soap opera
The Queen's Nose – children's drama
Queer as Folk – drama
A Question of Sport – panel game
Question Time – factual/politics
Questions for the Future – debate
Quiet as a Nun – drama
Quiz Call – quiz show
Quizmania – game show
Quiznation – game show

R

S

T

T-Bag – children's
Taboo – drama
Taff Acre – soap opera
Taggart – police drama
The Take – drama
Take a Letter – game show
Take a Letter, Mr. Jones – sitcom
Take Hart - children's art show
Take Me Out – game show
Take the High Road – soap opera
Take Your Pick! – game show
Takeover Bid – game show
Tales of the Unexpected – drama/horror – adaptations of roald dahl stories
Talk to Me – drama
Talking Heads – drama
Talking Telephone Numbers – game show
Talking Threads - Country Channel, reality
Tarby's Frame Game – game show
Target – police drama
Taskmaster – comedy/panel game
Taste – cookery
The Taste – cooking
Teachers – drama
The Teacher – drama
Tee and Mo – children's
Teen Big Brother: The Experiment – reality
Telecrime – crime drama
Teletubbies – children's
Tell the Truth – panel game show
Temptation Island UK – reality television
Tender Is the Night
Tenko – historical drama
Tess of the D'Urbervilles – drama
Testament of Youth – drama
Thailand: Earth's Tropical Paradise – nature documentary
Thank God You're Here – comedy
That Mitchell and Webb Look – comedy/sketch show
That Sunday Night Show – chat show/panel show
That Was The Team That Was – sports documentary
That Was the Week That Was – comedy/satire
That's Life! - magazine-style TV series
That's the Question – game show
Theatre 625 – drama anthology
Theatre Parade – excerpts from London shows
Thérèse Raquin
They Think It's All Over – panel game
There's Nothing to Worry About! – comedy sketch show
There's Something About Megan – music
There's Something About Miriam – reality television
The Thick of It – sitcom/satire
Thief Takers – crime drama
Thieves Like Us – sitcom
The Thin Blue Line – sitcom
Thin Ice – sitcom
The Third Eye – drama
This is Jinsy – surreal comedy/sitcom
This is England – 30somethingish drama
This Is Your Life – documentary/biography
This Life – drama
This Time Tomorrow – game show
This Time with Alan Partridge – comedy
This Week – current affairs (on ITV)
This Week – political affairs (on BBC)
Thomas & Friends – children's
Thorne – police drama
Threesome – comedy
Three of a Kind – comedy sketch show
Three Up, Two Down – comedy
Through the Keyhole – comedy/panel game show
Thunderbirds – science fiction
Tickety Toc – children's/animated
Tickle, Patch and Friends – animated
Tikkabilla – children's
Till Death... – situation comedy
Till Death Us Do Part – situation comedy
Time Gentlemen Please – situation comedy
Time of Our Lives – sport interview series
Time Team – history
Time Trumpet – comedy/mockumentary
Timeslip – science fiction
Timmy Time – children's/animated
Tinga Tinga Tales – children's/animated
Tiny Planets – children's
Tipping Point – quiz show
Tiswas – children's
Titch – children's
Tittybangbang – comedy sketches
TLC – sitcom
TNA British Boot Camp
To Me... To You... – children's
To Play the King – drama
To the Ends of the Earth – drama
To the Manor Born – situation comedy
Toast of London – comedy
Today's Business – news/talk show
Today's the Day – game show
Tofu – documentary
Together – soap opera
Tom, Dick and Harriet – sitcom
Tom Brown's Schooldays – drama
Tommy Zoom – children's
The Tomorrow People – science fiction
Tomorrow's World – factual
Tonight – news / current affairs
Tony Bennett at the Talk of the Town –  music
Tony Robinson's Crime and Punishment – documentary
Too Hot to Handle – reality television/game show
Toot the Tiny Tugboat – children's
Top Buzzer – sitcom
Top Gear (1977) – factual (with comical elements)
Top Gear (2002) – factual (with comical elements)
Top Gear Live – factual (with comical elements)
Top Ground Gear Force – factual (with comical elements)
Top of the Pops – music
Topsy and Tim – children's
Torchwood – science fiction
Torchwood Declassified – documentary/science fiction
Torn – drama/thriller
Total Wipeout – game show
Totally Senseless – comedy game show
Tots TV – children's
A Touch of Cloth – comedy/police procedural
A Touch of Frost – police drama
Touching Evil – crime drama
Towser – children's
Toytown – children's
Tracey Ullman's Show – sketch comedy
Tractor Tom – children's
Tracy Beaker Returns – children's/comedy-drama
Tracy Beaker Survival Files – children's/comedy-drama
Traffic Cops – motoring/police documentary
Traffik – drime/crama
Trainer – drama
Travel Man – travel documentary
Trawlermen – factual/documentary
Treasure Hunt – game show
Tree Fu Tom – children's
Trevor's World of Sport – situation comedy
Trial & Retribution – crime drama
Trial by Fire
The Trials of Life – nature documentary
The Triangle – science fiction
Triangle – drama/soap opera
The Tribal Eye – documentary
The Tribe – reality/documentary
Tribes, Predators & Me – nature documentary
Trick or Treat – game show
Trigger Happy TV – hidden camera stunts
The Trip – sitcom
The Tripods – science fiction
Tripper's Day – comedy
Tripping Over – drama
The Trisha Goddard Show – talk show
Trivial Pursuit – game show
Trollied – sitcom
Tronji – children's
Troy – magic show
Truckers – drama
True Dare Kiss – drama
True Love – drama
Trump: An American Dream – documentary
Trust – legal drama
Trust Me – drama
Trust Me – I'm a Beauty Therapist – reality television
Trying – comedy
The Tube – music
Tube Mice – children's
Tugs – children's
Tucker's Luck
The Tudors – historical drama
The Tunnel – crime drama
Tutankhamun – adventure drama
Tweenies – children's
Twenty Twelve – comedy
Twirlywoos – children's
Two Doors Down – sitcom
Two Fat Ladies – cooking
Two Pints of Lager and a Packet of Crisps – situation comedy
Two of a Kind – sketch show
The Two of Us – situation comedy
The Two Ronnies – comedy
Two's Company – situation comedy
TV Heaven, Telly Hell – comedy/talk show
TVGoHome – comedy/sketch show
Tycoon – reality television

U

V

W

X
X-Ray Mega Airport – documentary
Xpress – popular UK multicultural show
The X Factor (UK) – singing talent show

Y

Years and Years – drama
Yellowstone – nature documentary
Yellowstone: Wildest Winter to Blazing Summer – nature documentary
Yellowthread Street – crime drama
Yes Minister – situation comedy
Yes Prime Minister – situation comedy
Yonderland – fantasy/comedy
You Have Been Watching – comedy panel game
You Rang, M'Lord? – sitcom
You, Me and the Apocalypse – comedy-drama
You've Been Framed! – comedy
Young Apprentice – reality television
A Young Doctor's Notebook – dark black comedy
Young Hyacinth – sitcom
Young James Herriot – drama
The Young Ones – situation comedy
The Young Person's Guide to Becoming a Rock Star – comedy
Your Face Sounds Familiar – talent show
Your Life in Their Hands – medical reality/documentary
Yus, My Dear – sitcom

Z
Z-Cars – drama/action
Zack & Quack – animated
Zapped – sitcom
Zen – police drama
Zero Hour – documentary
ZingZillas – children's
Zoo Quest – nature documentary
Zoo Time – children's: animals

Other languages

Hindustani
Apna Hi Ghar Samajhiye – magazine

Scottish Gaelic
An Là – news
Dè a-nis? – children's
Dòtaman – children's
Eòrpa – current affairs
Machair – soap opera
Rapal – music
Seachd Là – news
Telefios – news

Urdu
Nai Zindagi Naya Jeevan – magazine

Welsh
Dechrau Canu, Dechrau Canmol – religion/music
Newyddion – news
Noson Lawen – entertainment
Pobol y Cwm – soap opera
Heno
Uned 5 – children's
Y Clwb Rygbi – sport
Y Pris – drama

See also
 British sitcom
 List of television programmes broadcast by the BBC
 BBC television drama
 100 Greatest (Channel 4 poll)
 100 Greatest British Television Programmes (British Film Institute poll)
 List of Australian television series
 Lists of Canadian television series

Series

Britain
Lists of British television series